St. Matthias Anglo Indian Higher Secondary School is one of the oldest schools in Chennai, India, located in Vepery, Chennai. It  has around 1,000 students on  roll drawn mainly from the Anglo-Indian community.

History

In the later half of the 19th century, St. Matthias' Church, Vepery Committee was responsible for the upkeep of several poor schools at Purasawalkam, Pudupet, Chintadripet and New Town. Lack  of funds and rising costs  led to a gradual reduction in this provision, leaving only two small schools at Pursawalkam and New Town. Records show that in 1891 the Pursawalkam School was recognized by the government as a lower primary school, following several years of existence as a private church school, hence its estimated age of a century. This early  school developed into St. Matthias High School. In 1912 the two primary schools at New Town and Pursawalkam were combined and located in a single new building in St. Matthias Church Compound, now the Parish Hall. The New Town School building was retained for the work of the Deaconesses of St. Faith's Order and its upper part forms the Church of St. Barnabas and the school was up-graded to a High School in 1975.

In August 1986 the School was upgraded to  Higher Secondary level and the facilities were enlarged.

Subjects

There are Two Major Categories of Subjects Offered by the School listed for the +1/+2 Examinations. They are as follows:  -

References

External links
 www.anglo-indians.com
 St Matthias Church
 

Christian schools in Tamil Nadu
Primary schools in Tamil Nadu
High schools and secondary schools in Chennai